Countess of Shrewsbury is a title used by the wife of the Earl of Shrewsbury.

Countess of Shrewsbury may refer to:

Margaret Beauchamp, Countess of Shrewsbury, countess 1425–1467
Anne Hastings, Countess of Shrewsbury, countess c.1481–1520
Gertrude Talbot, Countess of Shrewsbury, countess 1539–1567
Bess of Hardwick, countess 1568–1590
Mary Talbot, Countess of Shrewsbury, countess 1590–1616
Anna Maria Talbot, Countess of Shrewsbury, countess 1658–1668
Nadine, Countess of Shrewsbury, countess 1936–1963

See also

Shrewsbury